Harrison Page (born August 27, 1941) is an American television and film actor who has appeared in many popular series, including Sledge Hammer!, Cold Case, JAG, ER, Ally McBeal, Ultraman: The Ultimate Hero, Melrose Place, Quantum Leap, The Wonder Years, 21 Jump Street, Midnight Caller, Murder, She Wrote, Fame, Gimme a Break!, Benson, Hill Street Blues, Webster, The Dukes of Hazzard, Kung Fu, Kojak, Mannix, Soap, Bonanza, and Columbo. Supertrain 

A life member of The Actors Studio, Page is best known for playing the ill-tempered Captain Trunk in the ABC's 1980s police satire Sledge Hammer! He was also a regular on C.P.O. Sharkey, starring Don Rickles. In 1977, Page was taping a scene with Rickles when Johnny Carson (who was recording The Tonight Show just down the hall) suddenly burst in and berated Rickles about breaking Carson's cigarette box—an all-time classic bit of late-night TV history.

Page also appeared in the cult film Beyond the Valley of the Dolls, and  alongside Jean-Claude Van Damme in the box-office hit movie Lionheart (1990). In 1993, he appeared in Carnosaur.

Filmography

References

External links

1941 births
Living people
American male film actors
Male actors from Atlanta
African-American male actors
American male television actors
20th-century American male actors
21st-century American male actors
20th-century African-American people
21st-century African-American people